State Route 529 (SR 529) is a  state highway in Marion and Morrow Counties, Ohio. The route connects the city of Marion at SR 95 to SR 61 just north of the village of Fulton by way of Cardington.

Route description
SR 529 begins in the easternmost section of Marion at SR 95. The route heads southeast through the city and Marion Township passing through residential neighborhoods. At the intersection of Marion Cardington Road and Richland Road, the state route turns towards the east and passes under the US 23 freeway without an interchange. After this point, the route's surroundings become more rural as travels southeast towards Cardington. The road intersects SR 98 and SR 746 while in Marion County. After entering Morrow County, the route continues through rural farmlands before entering the village limits of Cardington on West Williams Street. SR 529 turns right onto Marion Street and intersects US 42 (Main Street) in the center of the village. The state route continues south until it reaches Nichols Street; here it turns left and eventually becomes Chesterville Avenue and exits the village. The route passes through more farmland before ending at an intersection with SR 61 and Morrow County Route 23.

History
The Marion–SR 61 route was first designated as SR 529 in 1939. The route between Marion and Cardington was paved at the route's inception but the Cardington–SR 61 segment was gravel-paved between 1939 and 1949. No major changes have occurred since then.

Major intersections

References

External links

529
Transportation in Marion County, Ohio
Transportation in Morrow County, Ohio